Mikhail Gennadyevich Muravyov (born 6 October 1965) is a former Russian football player.

References

1965 births
Living people
Soviet footballers
FC Spartak Vladikavkaz players
Russian footballers
FC Shinnik Yaroslavl players
Russian Premier League players
FC Vostok players
Russian expatriate footballers
Expatriate footballers in Kazakhstan
Association football forwards
FC Lukhovitsy players